To commemorate British gold medal winners at the 2012 Summer Olympics and 2012 Summer Paralympics, various post boxes in the home towns of the medal winners around the United Kingdom, plus one each on Sark and the Isle of Man, were repainted gold. It marked the first occasion in modern times that the colour of post boxes in the United Kingdom had been changed from their traditional red. Originally intended to be a temporary measure, due to the positive public response it was later decided the colour change would become a permanent tribute, with boxes additionally receiving their own special plaques.

Organisers and timeline
The project was organised by Royal Mail Group Communications in-house team, Eulogy and Blonde. Outside the United Kingdom, the Isle of Man Post and Guernsey Post also decided to emulate the Royal Mail scheme when athletes from their territories won gold (one each). The project was launched on 24 July by painting the box at Westminster Abbey, whilst the first athletes' boxes to be painted were in Lossiemouth for Heather Stanning and in Penzance for Helen Glover, to commemorate their medals in the women's coxless pair rowing.

While initially planning to commemorate only Olympic gold medallists, on 15 August 2012, Royal Mail confirmed that gold medallists at the 2012 London Paralympics would also be similarly recognised with boxes and stamps. On 19 September 2012, the Royal Mail relented to public pressure and decided to also commemorate Northern Irish Paralympians who won gold medals while competing for Ireland, reversing their position that "the stamps and gold post boxes were specifically for gold medal winning Olympian and Paralympians who competed for Team GB." On 2 November 2012, it was announced the boxes would retain their new colour permanently, and would also receive a plaque denoting the recipient.

Colour and precedent

According to Royal Mail, the first postboxes (pillar boxes) were erected in the UK in 1853, a year after trial boxes had been erected in Jersey. They were initially painted green, to blend in with the landscape, however between 1874 and 1884 they were repainted bright red to better stand out. This has remained the standard colour, with only a few exceptions, such as blue for Air Mail in the 1930s. Also according to Royal Mail, while gold stamp schemes had been introduced before, the UK is "believed to be the first country to paint post boxes gold to celebrate Olympic and Paralympic gold medal wins".

Locations
Each gold medallist in the 2012 games had a post box painted in recognition of their achievement, usually in their home-town.

Great Britain

Boxes were painted gold across Great Britain, as far north as Lossiemouth in Scotland, down to the near tip of South West England in Penzance, Cornwall. The actual site of boxes ranges greatly, from rural places such as village greens, to suburban high street locations such as Stratford-upon-Avon, to urban city centres.

Northern Ireland
Although athletes from Northern Ireland are eligible to compete for both Great Britain (Team GB and ParalympicsGB) and Ireland (Team Ireland and Paralympics Ireland), there were no GB gold medallists from Northern Ireland.

Due to the Royal Mail's decision to recognise Northern Irish medallists competing for Ireland, three Irish gold medal winning Paralympians were recognised with boxes in Eglinton (Jason Smyth), Glengormley (Michael McKillop) and Seaforde (Bethany Firth), although unlike the GB athletes, the multiple medallists (two each for Smyth and McKillop) did not receive multiple boxes.

Sark (Bailiwick of Guernsey)
The formerly blue post box on the island of Sark in the Bailiwick of Guernsey was painted gold by Guernsey Post to commemorate Carl Hester's team dressage success.

Isle of Man
The Isle of Man Post painted one gold box for Peter Kennaugh following success in the cycling team pursuit.

Location disputes
In some cases, the locations chosen by Royal Mail for gold boxes were disputed by either the athlete or members of the public as not being appropriate, either because the athlete was more closely associated with another location, or their home town was not as closely located as another location. In some cases, the Royal Mail attributed these errors to Team GB's athlete details database. This variously led to additional boxes being awarded, and in at least one case, a gold box being repainted red.

 For cyclist Joanna Rowsell, the Royal Mail initially painted a box in Carshalton, the location of her birth, however at the request of her family this was repainted red within a few days and replaced by a gold box in nearby Cheam, where she grew up and now lives.
 For sailor Ben Ainslie, the Royal Mail initially painted a box in Restronguet Passage, Cornwall, the place he grew up and learned to sail. A member of the public then painted a box in Lymington High Street, Hampshire, gold, on the basis that Ainslie was a long time resident and considered a local "legend". After initially filing a complaint, Royal Mail relented to a public campaign and decided to officially paint the Lymington box themselves.
 For canoeist Tim Baillie, the Mail painted a box in his home town of Westhill, Aberdeenshire. After requests from the public, a second box was added, also in Westhill, but in a more central location.
 For equestrian Peter Charles, Royal Mail painted a post box in Paper Mill Lane, Alton, Hampshire. It was soon pointed out that Charles lived in the nearby village of Bentworth (located 4 miles away), rather than the town itself and a second post box was painted accordingly.

Recipients
The majority of boxes were awarded to individual gold medalists, whether they were competing individually or as part of a team/crew. This meant that in several cases, multiple gold medal athletes received multiple boxes in various locations. The highest number awarded was four, for the quadruple gold medallists, Sarah Storey and David Weir.

In variation of the system of awarding one gold box per medal, there were variations on this theme (not counting instances of multiple boxes painted next to each other as a single site):

 Andy Murray, Ben Ainslie, Bradley Wiggins, Heather Stanning, Nick Skelton, Peter Charles and Tim Baillie all received two individual gold boxes at two separate sites, to commemorate a single gold medal.
 Charlotte Dujardin, Chris Hoy, Eleanor Simmonds, Mo Farah, Hannah Cockroft, Jason Kenny and Natasha Baker all received two individual gold boxes at two separate sites, to commemorate two gold medals.
 Laura Trott received three individual gold boxes at three separate sites to commemorate two gold medals
 Pete Reed received four individual gold boxes at three separate sites to commemorate one gold medal
 Sophie Christiansen received four individual gold boxes at four separate sites to commemorate three gold medals

In one case, a box was also shared between two athletes – cyclist Craig MacLean initially received one gold box in Grantown-on-Spey, Scotland, to commemorate his single gold medal won as an able-bodied pilot in the Paralympics, while Olympic cyclist Victoria Pendleton also initially received one gold box in Stotfold, Bedfordshire, to commemorate her single gold medal. A third box was later painted in their home town Wilmslow, Cheshire, dedicated to both of them.

In certain other cases, the boxes were awarded to commemorate recipients other than individual athletes:
 Two boxes to commemorate the Olympics (Westminster) and Paralympics (Stoke Mandeville), painted to launch each respective scheme
 A box to commemorate London hosting its third Olympic Games (Stratford)
 A box to commemorate British Cycling (Piccadilly Gardens, Manchester)
 A box to commemorate Henley's rowing clubs (Henley-on-Thames)

The Henley box was awarded to mark the over one hundred Olympic medal winning rowers who have trained at the town's Leander Club.

Types and cyphers
The type of box painted encompasses the wide variety of types in use.

The ubiquitous cylindrical pillar box was represented by both the traditional Type A (narrow) and Type B (wide) versions, plus the newer Type K pillar boxes (both singular and in pairs). The modern square shaped pillar box, the Type G, was also painted (singles and pairs). Various types of wall box were also represented, both installed in buildings, and in self-contained pillars. Representing the pole mounted type were two boxes of the more traditional design (Pete Reed in Watledge Road, Nailsworth and Bethany Firth in Seaforde), as well as a single example of the modern Type M (Tim Baillie, Westhill Drive North). A single example of the rare Penfold type hexagonal pillar box was also painted, for Sophie Wells in Lincoln. The Isle of Man box represents the only Type D painted gold (the D being a Type C oval but with a stamp vending machine), In one case, Nicola Adams' box in Leeds, as well as the post box, an adjacent Franked Mail Only type box was painted.

Reflecting the age range of the boxes painted, there are also a number of different Royal Cyphers, from the then-current Queen Elizabeth II (EIIR), to the historical versions for King Edward VII (EVIIR), King George V (G R) and Queen Victoria (V R). Also represented are Scottish boxes, which simply display the Scots Crown, and also boxes with no cypher at all.

Tourist attractions
The boxes were met by a very positive public reaction and have become tourist attractions within their local areas and many people have their photos taken alongside them.

Vandalism and unofficial boxes
Several of the official gold post boxes were subsequently vandalised. These included the ones for triathlete Alistair Brownlee, rower Kat Copeland, swimmer Josef Craig, heptathlete Jessica Ennis, and tennis player Andy Murray. Fans picked flecks of paint off Murray's box as souvenirs, while Ennis' box was defaced with the words "Go Jess".

A number of additional post boxes were painted by members of the public to commemorate silver and bronze medallists:
 In Wyke Regis, for silver medallist Nick Dempsey.
 In Doddington, Lincolnshire, for bronze medallist Georgie Twigg 
 In Lowestoft, for bronze medallist Anthony Ogogo.

The awarding of an additional box for Ben Ainslie in Lymington was precipitated by an episode of vandalism which saw the perpetrator arrested.

After Lizzy Yarnold's win in the Women's Skeleton during the 2014 Winter Olympics in Sochi, vandals crudely painted a post box gold in her hometown of Sevenoaks, Kent. Despite an online petition attracting 43,000 signatures, Royal Mail rejected demands for an official gold post box to be decorated, declaring that the 2012 Summer Olympics were a 'unique occasion'.

Two unofficial postboxes were positioned outside Home Park, Plymouth; one gold for Lithuanian swimmer Rūta Meilutytė, who is based in the city, and one bronze for diver Tom Daley.

Two unofficial boxes appeared in Posso and Kirkton Manor, both near Peebles in the Scottish borders, which also had its own official box in honour of Scott Brash.

In addition to the gold post box on Sark for Carl Hester, in 2020 Guernsey Post painted one of their (normally blue) post boxes gold in recognition of Percy Hodge who won a gold medal at the 1920 Olympic Games in Antwerp.

List of gold postboxes

Olympian boxes

Paralympian boxes
Key
 Athlete competed for Ireland

Stamps
In addition to the post boxes a first class stamp depicting each medal winning individual or team was produced.

See also
 

Great Britain at the 2012 Summer Olympics
Great Britain at the 2012 Summer Paralympics
Ireland at the 2012 Summer Paralympics

References

External links
Gold Postbox Finder

Post boxes
Postal system of the United Kingdom
Royal Mail labour relations
Post boxes
Great Britain at the Olympics
Street furniture